No. 101 Squadron of the Royal Air Force operates the Airbus Voyager in the air-to-air refuelling and transport roles from RAF Brize Norton, Oxfordshire.

History

Formation and early years
101 Squadron RFC was formed at Farnborough on 12 July 1917 operating the Royal Aircraft Factory FE2b. Two weeks later it moved to France to operate as a night bomber squadron. In March 1919 the squadron returned to the UK and it was disbanded on 31 December 1919.

Reformation and World War II
The squadron was reformed in March 1928 at RAF Bircham Newton as a day bomber squadron flying the Boulton Paul Sidestrand. In 1938 the squadron was equipped with the Bristol Blenheim. In 1941 the squadron changed to a medium-bomber squadron with the Vickers Wellington. These were replaced the following year with the Avro Lancaster. 101 Squadron Lancasters were in 1943 equipped with a top secret radio jamming system codenamed "Airborne Cigar" (ABC) operated by an eighth crew member who could understand German, some with German or Jewish backgrounds known as "special operators" commonly abbreviated to "spec ops" or "SO". They sat in a curtained off area towards the rear of the aircraft and located and jammed German fighter controller's broadcasts, occasionally posing as controllers to spread disinformation. The aircraft fitted with the system were distinctive due to the two large vertical antennae rising from the middle of the fuselage.  Deliberately breaking the standing operating procedure of radio silence to conduct the jamming made the aircraft highly vulnerable to being tracked and attacked, which resulted in 101 Squadron having the highest casualty rate of any RAF squadron.

Post-war
In October 1945, the squadron moved to RAF Binbrook, Lincolnshire and in June 1946 re-equipped with Avro Lincolns. These aircraft were deployed in conducting small-scale raids against the Quteibi tribe at Thumier in Aden in October 1947.

On 25 May 1950, the squadron took delivery of its first English Electric Canberra B2 thereby becoming the RAF’s first jet bomber unit.  Without a training unit in existence, conversion to type was achieved by the squadron itself with assistance from English Electric test pilots. Most of the type’s service trials were flown by the squadron and, by the end of 1950, nine Canberra B2s were held on strength. Out of the pool of type-qualified crews, a wing of five squadrons had been formed by August 1952 at Binbrook, comprising Nos. 9, 12, 50, 101 and 617.

In June 1954, the squadron became the first to receive the B.6 variant of the Canberra.  After full conversion to the type, the Binbrook Wing of five squadrons undertook an intensive training programme in readiness for staged detachments to Malaya as support for Operation Firedog. This was a large-scale counter-insurgency campaign, on-going in Malaya since 1948 against communist guerrillas.
101 Squadron became the first RAF jet bomber squadron to serve in the Far East when four Canberras arrived at Changi on 11 February 1955. The first bomb drop by an RAF jet bomber occurred when the squadron, which had been deployed to RAF Butterworth, Penang, was operating against a target in Johore. Over a period of two months operating from Butterworth, ninety-eight raids were made before the squadron returned to Binbrook on 21 June 1955.  A final deployment to the same base from June to August 1956 signified the last Canberra participation in the Malayan operation. Also in 1956, the squadron flew night bombing raids against Egyptian airfields from their base at Hal Far, Malta during the Suez crisis. With the entry into service of the V bombers, Canberras in the bomber role were becoming outmoded. Consequently, 101 Squadron was temporarily disbanded on 1 February 1957.

Vulcans

The squadron reformed on 15 October 1957 as part of RAF Bomber Command's V bomber force maintaining the UK's strategic nuclear deterrent, equipped with Avro Vulcan B1s from RAF Finningley, and in 1961 the squadron moved from Finningley to RAF Waddington where it remained until disbandment in 1982. Its aircraft were now the upgraded Vulcan B1A fitted with the ECM tailpod. The squadron's assigned role was high-level strategic bombing with a variety of free fall nuclear bombs. These included American bombs supplied to the RAF under Project E.

On 20 June 1961 a 101 Squadron Vulcan B1A (XH481) flew non-stop from RAF Waddington to the Royal Australian Air Force Base Richmond, NSW, the longest recorded non-stop flight by a Vulcan, and the 10,000 nmi flight still stands as a record for the Vulcan, exceeding the mileage done by the Black Buck Vulcan by some 3,000 nmi.

After the advent of effective Soviet SAMs forced Bomber Command to reassign V bombers from high-altitude operations to low-level penetration operations in March 1963, the squadron's Vulcans adopted a mission profile that included a 'pop-up' manoeuvre from 500–1,000 ft to above 12,000 ft for safe release of Yellow Sun Mk2.

By Dec 1967 the squadron was re-equipped with eight Vulcan B2 aircraft and eight WE.177B laydown bombs which 
improved aircraft survivability by enabling aircraft to remain at low-level during weapon release. 

Following the transfer of responsibility for the nuclear deterrent to the Royal Navy the squadron was reassigned to SACEUR for tactical strike missions still armed with the WE.177B bomb and a variety of conventional munitions. In a high-intensity European war the squadron's new role was to support land forces on the Continent resisting an assault on Western Europe by the Red Army, by striking deep into enemy-held areas beyond the forward edge of the battlefield, striking at enemy concentrations and infrastructure, first with conventional weapons and secondly with WE.177 tactical nuclear weapons as required, should a conflict escalate to that stage. The squadron continued in this role until the Falklands War of 1982 when the squadron performed operations during the campaign in the South Atlantic, and was then disbanded on 4 August 1982.

Tankers
In 1978, the RAF announced a plan to convert second-hand civil Vickers VC10 aircraft for conversion to aerial refuelling aircraft and the first K2 flew in 1982.  No 101 Squadron was chosen to operate the aircraft and was reformed at RAF Brize Norton on 1 May 1984. Notable recent deployments of 101 Squadron include the Gulf War and the 2003 invasion of Iraq. The VC10 aircraft was retired on 20 September 2013, and was replaced by the Airbus Voyager.

Aircraft operated

See also
List of Royal Air Force aircraft squadrons

References

Notes

Bibliography

 Alexander, Raymond. Special Operations: No.101 Squadron. Published privately, 1979.
 Ashworth, Chris. Encyclopedia of Modern Royal Air Force Squadrons. Wellingborough, UK: Patrick Stevens Limited, 1989. .
 Halley, James J. The Squadrons of the Royal Air Force & Commonwealth, 1918-1988. Tonbridge, Kent, UK: Air-Britain (Historians) Ltd., 1988. .
 Hobson, Chris. Mind over Matter: A Brief History of 101 Squadron Royal Air Force 1917-1988.  Published privately, 1988.
 Jefford, C.G. RAF Squadrons, a Comprehensive Record of the Movement and Equipment of all RAF Squadrons and their Antecedents since 1912. Shrewsbury: Airlife Publishing, 2001. .
 Moyes, Philip J.R. Bomber Squadrons of the RAF and their Aircraft. London: Macdonald and Jane's (Publishers) Ltd., 1964 (new edition 1976). .

External links

 101 Squadron on RAF Website
 History of No.'s 101–105 Squadrons at RAF Web
 101 Squadron photos, life stories, documents, and memorabilia at the International Bomber Command Centre Digital Archive.
 Aircraft and Markings for 101 Squadron
 RAF Brize Norton - 101 Squadron
 

101 Squadron
101 Squadron
Military units and formations established in 1917
Military units and formations of the United Kingdom in the Falklands War
Military units and formations of the Gulf War
1917 establishments in the United Kingdom